Miss America 1922, the second annual Miss America pageant, was held at the Million Dollar Pier in Atlantic City, New Jersey from September 7–9, 1922.

At the conclusion of the event, Miss America 1921, Margaret Gorman of Washington, D.C., and film actress, Anita Stewart, presented the $5,000 Golden Mermaid Trophy to Mary Katherine Campbell of Columbus, Ohio thus declaring Campbell as the official successor to the Miss America title.

Overview

Organization of pageant
The pageant consisted of six phases of competition: rolling chair parade, evening gown, intercity bathing, amateur surf attire, professional mermaids, and the final. There was no talent competition at this pageant (this would not become part of the Miss America competition until 1935), and there was no formal interview sessions between the contestants and judges.

On the afternoon of September 7, 1922, the 58 contestants competed in the rolling chair parade. Later that same day, they competed in the evening gown competition. Both the rolling chair and evening gown competitions were won by Miss Indianapolis, Thelma Blossom. On September 8, 1922, the contestants competed in bathing suit revues. The contestants were divided into three unique groupings: intercity, amateur, and professional beauties. During the bathing revue, the Mayor of Atlantic City and some of the city's police force joined the contestants, wearing their own bathing attire.

The three winners of these bathing/beauty competitions then progressed to the final phase of competition to compete directly against the reigning Miss America 1921, Margaret Gorman. Mary Katherine Campbell, competing as Miss Columbus in the pageant, edged out the previous year's winner, Margaret Gorman, who competed as "Miss America 1921" in the 1922 event, to claim the preliminary "Intercity Beauty Award." Campbell then competed against "Professional Beauty Award" winner, Dorothy Knapp of New York, "Amateur Beauty Award" winner, Gladys Greenamyer of West Philadelphia, and Gorman, the reigning Miss America. After the conclusion of the final phase of competition, judging panel deliberated for over two hours before selecting the sole winner of the pageant. Mary Katherine Campbell, Miss Columbus, was then named Miss America 1922 just after midnight on September 9, 1922.

Judges
The panel of judges for the national pageant included Heyworth Campbell, Coles Phillips, Joseph Cummings Chase, Arnold Genthe, Willy Pogany, August William Hutaf, Norman Rockwell, and Howard Chandler Christy. Rockwell later reported that the judging panel was given no instructions on how to judge the pageant and select a winner. One judge suggested that they judge each part or feature of the body out of ten, then the woman with the total highest score would win. After they had tried this system, they discovered that judging a contestant "piecemeal" did not result in the most beautiful and well-rounded contestant being selected as a winner. So they "...gave up trying to figure out a system and resolved to trust our eyes. It led to squabbles, because all of us didn't see things in the same way, but it was the best we could do."

Results

Placements

Preliminary awards

Contestants

Notes

References

Secondary sources

External links
 Miss America official website
 missamerica1933.com

1922
1922 in the United States
1922 in New Jersey
September 1922 events